The Microfilm Archive of the German Language Press e. V. (Mikrofilmarchiv der deutschsprachigen Presse, MFA for short) is an organization that was founded in 1965 with the intention to archive the printed press, in particular daily newspapers, in microfilmed form. It is headquartered in Dortmund. It is collaborating closely with the Institute for Newspaper Research in Dortmund.

External links
Website of the Microfilm Archive
Information about the Microfilm Archive
Inventory Archive of the Microfilm Archive

Archives in Germany
Organizations established in 1965
Organisations based in North Rhine-Westphalia
Cultural organisations based in Germany
Mass media in Dortmund